The topography of the New England Uplands section is that of a maturely-dissected plateau with narrow valleys, and the entire area is greatly modified by glaciation. It is the most widespread of the geomorphic sections in the New England Province, extending from Canada through New England down to the Seaboard section and extending southwestward through New York and New Jersey as two narrow upland projections, the Reading Prong and the Manhattan Prong. Numerous hills and mountains rise above the general level of the upland; except in the presence of mountains, the horizon of the regional landscape is fairly level. Glaciation has resulted in the erosion and rounding off of the bedrock topography and numerous rock basin lakes. Glacial drift is thin, patchy, and stony, and ice-contact features such as kames, kame terraces, and eskers are abundant.

In the New York Bight watershed, the New England Uplands section is represented by a portion of the Taconic Mountains and its foothills, and by the Reading and Manhattan Prongs that extend southwestward from the New England states. Although geologists refer to the larger of these extensions as the Reading Prong, in this region it is more commonly known as the New York - New Jersey Highlands, and locally as the Hudson Highlands, the New Jersey Highlands, the Ramapo Mountains, or simply the Highlands. The Highlands are bounded on the southeast and on the northwest by the lowlands of the Piedmont and Great Valley provinces, respectively. The Hudson River cuts a deep gorge through the Highlands in New York in the stretch of river between Peekskill on the south and Newburgh on the north.

External links

Geology of Connecticut
Geology of Maine
Geology of Massachusetts
Geology of New Hampshire
Geology of New Jersey
Geology of New York (state)
Geology of Pennsylvania
Geology of Rhode Island
Geology of Vermont
Geography of New England
Highlands
Appalachian Mountains